IMHS may refer to:

International Health and Medical Services
Immaculate Heart of Mary Seminary (Philippines)